The 1965 World Shotgun Championships were separate ISSF World Shooting Championships for the trap and skeet events held in Santiago, Chile.

Medal count

Results

References

ISSF World Shooting Championships
Shooting
S
1965 in Chilean sport
1960s in Santiago, Chile
Sports competitions in Santiago
Shooting competitions in Chile